Kevin Thomas Shinick (born March 19, 1969) is an American writer, producer, director and actor, as well as a comic book creator. Shinick received an Emmy award for his work on the stop motion animated series Robot Chicken, and an Emmy nomination for his work on Mad, the animated series based on the iconic humor magazine, before serving as showrunner and supervising producer for Disney XD's Emmy nominated animated series, Marvel's Spider-Man. Shinick also played a role as the ACME Time Net Squadron Leader of the PBS series Where in Time Is Carmen Sandiego?.

Biography

Early life
Shinick was born in the Long Island suburb of Merrick, New York. He attended Sanford H. Calhoun High School, and continued onto nearby Hofstra University where he earned a bachelor's degree in both theatre and communication. During his time at Hofstra he appeared as a contestant on the game show Jackpot!, where he shared a $14,500 jackpot during its first week in September 1989.

Theatre career
A year after graduating college, Shinick received his first big job when legendary actor Tony Randall cast him in his Broadway production of The Seagull opposite Ethan Hawke, Laura Linney, Tyne Daly, Jon Voight and Tony Roberts. Subsequent Broadway plays followed, including Night Must Fall with Matthew Broderick, The School For Scandal again with Tony Randall, The Government Inspector with Lainie Kazan and the Tony nominated productions of Timon of Athens and Saint Joan.

In 2002, Shinick served as writer and director for the multimillion-dollar production of Spider-Man Live!, a Broadway-style adaptation of the famed comic book hero that played to large venues such as Radio City Music Hall. The show embarked on a 40 city U.S. tour and has the distinction of being the country's first full length live-action stage show based on the Marvel comic book character.

Television and film work
In 1996, Shinick began entertaining television audiences as the host and squadron leader of the television series Where in Time Is Carmen Sandiego?, a PBS show which launched him into teen magazines, onto trading cards and into his own action figure.

In 2004, Shinick wrote, directed and starred in the feature film, It's About Time, a romantic comedy in which Tony Randall makes his final appearance.

Beginning in 2007, Shinick began working as a writer for Adult Swim's stop-motion series, Robot Chicken where he quickly expanded his role to include voice artist, creative director, producer and eventually co-executive producer on their Robot Chicken DC Comics Special III: Magical Friendship.

The August 31, 2008 episode of Robot Chicken, "Tubba-Bubba's Now Hubba-Hubba" features a "Where in Time" parody.

In 2010, he created the animated sketch series, Mad with fellow producer Mark Marek and based on the iconic comedy magazine, which premiered on Cartoon Network on September 6, 2010. Shinick is credited as head writer, producer, and is one of the voice actors on the show. Mad ran for four seasons and officially concluded in December 2013, with the main sketch pairing "Alfred's Game / We Are X-Men".

In 2016, Shinick began crafting a new "Spider-Man" series for Disney XD titled Marvel's Spider-Man which debuted August 19, 2017.

Also in 2017, Shinick joined the writing staff of the Netflix comedy Disjointed created by Chuck Lorre and David Javerbaum and starring Kathy Bates as the owner of a pot dispensary.

As an actor, Shinick has guest starred on various television shows including Grimm, Masters of Sex, Major Crimes, Trust Me, Rizzoli & Isles, Without a Trace and Monday Mornings.

Shinick appeared as a guest on The George Lucas Talk Show during their May the AR Be LI$$ You Arli$$ marathon fundraiser.

Comic books
Since 2009, Shinick has written comics for both Marvel Comics and DC Comics.

For DC Comics: DC's annual "Batman 80-Page Giant" and "Joker's Asylum II: Clayface".

For Marvel Comics: "Avenging Spider-Man", "Superior Carnage", "Superior Spider-Man Team-Up" and "AXIS: Hobgoblin".

Novels
In 2019, Disney-Lucasfilm Press released the Star Wars young-adult canon novel Force Collector, written by Shinick, as part of the Journey to Star Wars: The Rise of Skywalker publishing program.

References

External links

Spider-Man Live! at Live Design

1969 births
Living people
American game show hosts
American male stage actors
American male voice actors
Annie Award winners
Hofstra University alumni
People from Merrick, New York
Primetime Emmy Award winners
Sanford H. Calhoun High School alumni
20th-century American male actors
21st-century American male actors